Elijah Johnson (born June 24, 1998), also known as EJ, is an American singer and actor, and former member of the boy band Mindless Behavior. Born in Detroit, Michigan, EJ began his career playing the character of Young Simba in the Disney Broadway Production of The Lion King. Later in his career, EJ became the lead singer of the Kidz Bop crew until 2013. EJ is also known for performance on stage many times as a kid and for his singles "Meet Me on the Dance Floor".

Life and career
In April 2014, Elijah was announced to be a new member of Mindless Behavior . He remained a member of the group, among Princeton and Mike River, until its disbandment in 2017.

In June 2016, Mindless Behavior released their first album as the new "MB" titled #OfficialMBMusic. The album made number 100 in the Billboard Year End Chart. It was released instead of their recorded album "Recharge" due to member Ray Ray leaving the group and having Mike River as a replacement. This left the group as a trio with members Princeton, EJ, and Mike River. Later that summer, the group was part of a film called Misguided Behavior, which was released later in the summer of 2017. Elijah J's anticipated solo EP was due to be released at the end of 2017. EJ also starred in the 2022 BET movie, "The Millennial".

Filmography

References

1998 births
Living people
Musicians from Los Angeles
21st-century American singers
21st-century American male singers
 African-American male singers